Halyna Kovalska (born on 11 August 1996 in Nadvirna, Ivano-Frankivsk Oblast) is a Ukrainian sambist. She is 2019 European Games bronze medalist in women's sambo. She is also a 2019 European champion and multiple European and World championships medallist.

References 

1996 births
Living people
Ukrainian sambo practitioners
Sambo practitioners at the 2019 European Games
European Games medalists in sambo
European Games bronze medalists for Ukraine